Felimare juliae is a species of sea slug or dorid nudibranch, a marine gastropod mollusc in the family Chromodorididae.

Distribution 
This species was described from a specimen measuring  collected intertidally at Praia das Conchas, Cabo Frio, state of Rio de Janeiro, Brazil,  and a paratype, from Ilha dos Papagaios, Cabo Frio . Reported from Florida and probably present at intermediate localities in the western Atlantic Ocean.

Description
Felimare juliae is similar in appearance to Felimare picta with a dark blue background colour but is densely covered on the mantle and foot with fine longitudinal orange lines. The mantle has a frilly edge with a marginal orange line enclosing a series of larger pale blue spots and pale blue spots occur amongst the orange lines.

References

Chromodorididae
Gastropods described in 2010